Michigan RFC is an American rugby team based in Ann Arbor, Michigan. The team plays in the Midwest Conference of the  USA Rugby Division III.

History
The club was founded in 1959 at the University of Michigan and was originally composed of both university students and faculty as well as players with no affiliation to the university. 

In January 2000 the club and university teams formally split up into separate clubs as a result of USA Rugby regulations.

Honors
USA Rugby Division II
1995

External links
Michigan RFC

American rugby union teams
Rugby clubs established in 1959
1959 establishments in Michigan
Sports in Ann Arbor, Michigan